Tuần Châu is a schist island on the southwest side of Hạ Long City in Vietnam.

Overview 
Covered by palm forests, Tuần Châu island has an area of 2.2 km2 and to the east and south are two man-made beaches endowed with very white, fine sand. Nowadays, Tuần Châu Island is one of the most touristic destinations in Hạ Long.

Etymology 
In the feudal time, the royal army set up a guard station here to patrol and defend the borderland. The name of Tuần Châu is the combination between ‘linh tuan’ (the patrolman) and ‘tri chau’ (district chief).

Location 
Tuần Châu is located an important position at the entrance of the waterway system of Thăng Long, Bặch Đằng and Vân Ðồn.

History 
The island has many archaeological sites pertaining to the ancient Hạ Long culture from 3,000 to 5,000 years ago.
Because of its location, the royal army set up a guard station here to patrol and defend the borderland. The Office of Feudal Customs was also installed there.
President Hồ Chí Minh used to spend holidays there, in an octagonal house that has now become a memorial site.

Tourism 
Tuần Châu Island can be reached via the 2-km cement road from the mainland. The construction of this road was undertaken by Tuan Chau 5-star yacht company and officially started on February 28, 1998. Investments have been poured into the island to create a modern tourist resort. It includes attractions such as the dolphin, sea lion, and performing-seal club, animal circus club, golf course, cultural-sports center, beach, rural market, ornamental fish lake, villas in Hill 1 and Hill 2, guesthouses, five 80-room villas by the beach. The ensemble of five restaurants and one round house built in the pagoda motif can serve up to 500 guests at a time.

From 2014, there is another way to reach Tuan Chau Island from Hanoi that is a direct flight from Hanoi to Tuan Chau Island, Halong Bay by seaplane of Hai Au Aviation. The flight allows you to enjoy a bird's eye view of the thousands of limestone karsts jutting up from the jade green waters and see remote fishing villages before landing at Tuan Chau Island Marina.

The Marina 

The pier of Tuần Châu island hosts only 10% of all boat companies cruising on Halong bay and provides cruisers with cafés, souvenir shops, and daily entertainment shows with young local dancers performing modern dances. Some boat companies also offer private lounges for their passengers awaiting boarding time. Tuần Châu island is at present constructing a much larger marina integrated in a touristic resort that should be completed in years to come.

In 2004, Miss Vietnam was held there. In 2005, Tuần Châu was where "Vietnam: The Island of Mr. Sang" episode of Anthony Bourdain: No Reservations was filmed.

See also 
 Tuần Châu Aquarium

References

Islands of Vietnam
Landforms of Quảng Ninh province